Dorette Corbey (born July 19, 1957, in Eindhoven, North Brabant) is a Dutch politician and former Member of the European Parliament (MEP). She is a member of the Partij van de Arbeid (Dutch Labour Party), which is part of the Party of European Socialists, and sat on the European Parliament's Committee on the Environment, Public Health and Food Safety.

She was also a substitute for the Committee on Industry, Research and Energy and a member of the delegation for relations with the People's Republic of China.

Education
 General nursing training
 Higher degree in social geography, University of Amsterdam
 Doctoral degree in law and international relations, State University of Leiden

Career
 1976-1988: Worked as a general nurse (part-time from 1981)
 1988-1993: Researcher, Netherlands Institute for International Relations, 'Clingendael', The Hague
 1993-1999: Policy adviser, Building and Timber Federation, FNV (Dutch Trade Union Federation) 
 1996-1997: Project coordinator - European Works Councils, European Federation of Building and Woodworkers, Brussels
 1997-1999: Member of the European Integration Committee of the Advisory Council on International Affairs
 since 1999: Member of the European Parliament

External links
 
 
 

1957 births
Living people
Labour Party (Netherlands) MEPs
MEPs for the Netherlands 1999–2004
MEPs for the Netherlands 2004–2009
20th-century women MEPs for the Netherlands
21st-century women MEPs for the Netherlands
People from Eindhoven